Marc Warren is an American television producer and writer. He is best known for work on the series Full House, Even Stevens and That's So Raven, all of which he worked on with fellow producer and writer Dennis Rinsler.

Career
Warren worked as school teacher in New York City. It was there he met Dennis Rinsler before moving to Los Angeles. Their experiences as teachers was the inspiration for the 1990s sitcom Nick Freno: Licensed Teacher starring Mitch Mullany, which they also produced, receiving co-creation credit with Richard Gurman. They both formed the production company "Warren & Rinsler Productions".

They have been active since 1982, writing and producing for the television series Madame's Place, Fast Times, Full House (which they also executive produced and served as showrunners of for the series' final three seasons), The Parent 'Hood and served as creators of Cory in the House. The two have been nominated for Daytime and Primetime Emmys for their work on the Disney Channel series Even Stevens and That's So Raven.

In 2009, Rinsler and Warren dissolved their partnership. The two had each already been writing and directing solo during their runs as executive producers of Even Stevens (Rinsler directing the episode "Beans on the Brain"), That's So Raven (Warren directing five episodes) and Cory in the House (Warren directing two episodes, while retaining a producer partnership). Warren eventually landed a solo job as a writer and consulting producer of Jonas for its second and last season in 2010.

Warren ran the Disney Channel Storytellers program, which was launched in 2014 as an initiative to find new talent in creating and writing for Disney programming content.

References

External links

American television directors
American television producers
American television writers
American male television writers
Living people
Place of birth missing (living people)
Year of birth missing (living people)